Bushra Elfadil (born 1952 in northern Sudan) is a Sudanese writer, living in Saudi Arabia. He has published several collections of short stories and novels in Arabic, with some of his stories translated into English, for example as part of anthologies of contemporary fiction from Sudan. In 2017, he was awarded the Caine Prize for African Writing.

Career
Elfadil was born in 1952 in the village of Araggi in the Northern State of Sudan. Later, he moved with his family to the village of Wad El-Bor in the state of Al Jazirah in central Sudan, where he received his primary education.

He studied in Moscow and received his PhD in Russian language and literature. When he returned to Sudan, he was appointed as lecturer in the department for Russian language in the Faculty of Arts at Khartoum University. After protests against the military government of Omar al-Bashir in the early 1990s, he was expelled from that university, along with other lecturers and hundreds of students.

Personal life 
Elfadil has a daughter and four sons. Two of them, Basil and Bahir pursue careers as  doctors. In 2018, he emigrated to Toronto in Canada, and currently lives there.

Recognition 
In 2012, he was awarded the El-Tayeb Salih Prize for Creative Writing in Arabic by the Sudanese ministry of culture. Further, he won the Caine Prize in 2017 with "The Story of the Girl Whose Birds Flew Away", published in The Book of Khartoum - A City in Short Fiction. In a review, this story was characterised as follows: "...the winning story is one that explores through metaphor and an altered, inventive mode of perception – including, for the first time in the Caine Prize, illustration – the allure of, and relentless threats to freedom." In 2016, his story 'Two spaces objects over Bandar' was published in Literary Sudans : an anthology of literature from Sudan and South Sudan.

Works
Elfadil has published several collections of short stories and novels in Arabic:
Hikkayat al-bint allati tarrat asafiraha (The story of the girl whose birds flew away) - short story
Azrraq Alyamama
Al-hossan al-tayer (The Flying Horse), a collection of children's stories
Gassied fil zil (Poems in the shadow)
Above a City’s Sky (2012)

References

External links

 The Opening Ceremony - a short story by Bushra Elfadil, translated by Elisabeth Jaquette
Bushra Fadil’s ‘Phosphorus at the Bottom of a Well’, translated by Mustafa Adam
Banipal 56, Generation '56 (Summer 2016)

Sudanese male short story writers
Sudanese short story writers
1952 births
Living people
Caine Prize winners